Ak-Tash is a village in Jalal-Abad Region of Kyrgyzstan. Its population was 1,491 in 2021.

References

Populated places in Jalal-Abad Region